The Party of Kosovo Serbs (PKS) is a political party of the Serb minority in Kosovo, led by former Serb List leader Aleksandar Jablanović. The city of Leposavić is considered the strongest support of the party.

History 

Aleksandar Jablanović was previously the Minister of Communities and Returns in the Government of Kosovo. Then Prime Minister Isa Mustafa dismissed him from office in February 2015 after a statement in which, as judged from Pristina, he insulted the mothers of Gjakova by calling the students of the attack on the bus with Serbs going to the cemetery in Gjakova "savages". After that incident, Jablanović moved to the Ministry of Labour, Employment, Veterans and Social Affairs of the Government of Serbia, and resigned after the incident with his brother.

The Party of Kosovo Serbs led by Aleksandar Jablanović was founded on 6 April 2017 and registered on 15 May 2017.

In June 2017, cases of conflicts between the PKS and the Serb List members were noted.

In the 2017 Kosovan parliamentary election, PKS won just 2126 votes, and they missed the extraordinary elections for mayors of municipalities in the North in May this year.

The party also took part in the 2019 parliamentary election, but lost it to the Serb List.

In November 2022, during the North Kosovo crisis, after negotiations with Kosovo President Vjosa Osmani, the party decided to stop boycotting the 2022 local elections and take part in them.

References 

Serb political parties in Kosovo
Serb organizations
Political parties established in 2017
2017 establishments in Kosovo